Toboso, officially the Municipality of Toboso, is a 3rd class municipality in the province of Negros Occidental, Philippines. According to the 2020 census, it has a population of 43,445 people.

History
The site of what would become Toboso dated back to the precolonial period. The center of the original settlement was  first known as Sag-ahan, an archaic word which means in the Cebuano language "to take out or catch fish by the hands" because fish were abundant in the coast and rivers, and eventually lent its name to the contemporary barangay Sagahan.

Upon Spanish colonization, the community was named Toboso in honor of a similar settlement in Spain, El Toboso, famous for appearing in the novel Don Quixote by the Spanish writer Miguel de Cervantes, as the town in which the fictional character Dulcinea del Toboso lives. Toboso was then a barrio of Municipality of Escalante. Like many other settlements on the eastern coast of Negros, the community of Toboso had expanded with the coming of immigrants from the island of Cebu and developed extensively in fishing, agriculture and commerce.

During early period of American colonization of the Philippines, more impetus was dedicated to a sugarcane mill called the Central Azucarera del Danao at Labilabi, 6 kilometers from Toboso. The development of the sugar industry was started and gave livelihood to members of the community of Toboso.

After Philippine Independence, Toboso continued to thrive as a part of Escalante until Executive Order No. 141 was signed by president Elpidio Quirino "Organizing Certain Barrios of the Municipality of Escalante, Province of Negros Occidental, into an Independent Municipality Under the Name "Toboso". The chartering executive order states:
Starting from the month of Salamanca River, upstream following the course of this river to its intersection with Tinobaga Creek; thence following the course of this creek to B.B.M. No. 6; thence running in a straight line to B.B.M. No. 5; thence following the course of the Aglolomot Creek until it intersects latitude 10° 45′; thence in a straight east-to-west line which coincides with latitude 10° 45′ to its intersection with the present Escalante-Sagay boundary line; thence southwestward following the said Escalante-Sagay boundary line to the point where it intersects the present Escalante-Calatrava boundary line; thence southeastward following the Escalante-Calatrava boundary line, then the Escalante-San Carlos boundary line as shown in the boundary and index map of Escalante cadastre, B.L. case No. 2, surveyed July, 1917, to October, 1918, by survey party No. 19 of the Bureau of Lands, passing through M.B.M. No. 2, to M.B.M. No. 1, on the shore of Tañon Strait.

The organization herein made shall take effect on July 1, 1948.

Economy
Economic progress in Toboso is sluggish due to the limited number of business establishments. It is commonly tagged as "one of the municipalities with a high number of poverty incidence in Negros Occidental". Since its municipality recognition on July 1, 1948, the town struggled to be at par with its neighboring cities like Escalante, Sagay, San Carlos and the town of Calatrava.

Economy primarily depends on sugarcane production, the plantations of which constitute largest land use, 4,746 hectares and produced 237,300 metric tons of sugarcane on 2019. Coconut production harvested 4,100 metric tons on the same year. Corn, livestock raising, poultry, game fowl and fishing are also major contributors to local economy. Inhabitants often find work in neighboring provinces (engage in shipbuilding). Others work as Overseas Filipino Workers, others engage in handicraft business. Some choose food preparations and forming of local, small businesses.

Tourism
The Mainit Hot Springs are located in the area of ​​the Barangay San Isidro, twelve kilometers from the town center. Kampanoy Cave, located on the territory of Barangay General Luna, has a spacious interior which resembles a dome cathedral, next to the coast and is inhabited by Edible-nest swiftlet (Aerodramus fuciphagus) which in recent years has been damaged because of phosphate mining. Trangkalan Cave is located in Brgy. Magticol, until recently it was used for native folk religious acts. The magnificent 250 meter high cascades of the Dalisun Waterfalls are located near Sitio Vergara, Brgy. Bug-ang. Offshore Toboso is the 200-acre/80 hectare Kevin's Reef, a 10-minute boat ride away.

Geography
The municipality of Toboso is located on the northeastern side of the province of Negros Occidental and is facing the island of Cebu.  It is bounded on the southwest by the municipality of Calatrava; northwest by the city of Sagay; north by the city of Escalante and east by Tañon Strait.  The shoreline runs along the Tañon Strait from Calatrava boundary to the Escalante boundary facing east.

Barangays
Toboso is politically subdivided into 9 barangays.
Bandilla
Bug-ang
General Luna
Magticol
Poblacion
Salamanca
San Isidro
San Jose
Tabun-ac

Climate

Demographics

The inhabitants speak Cebuano (95.34%), followed by Hiligaynon (4.27%). Tagalog and English are widely used in schools, businesses, and government offices.

Notable people
Ambrocio Dogomeo, barangay councilor of Bandilla who received the 1995 Sajid Bulig Award from the Department of the Interior and Local Government (DILG) for his heroism in helping residents evacuate to an elementary school building during Typhoon Pepang.

References

External links
Official website
[ Philippine Standard Geographic Code]
Philippine Census Information
Local Governance Performance Management System

Municipalities of Negros Occidental
Establishments by Philippine executive order